Michele Aparecida Pereira Reis (born 10 June 1984), or simply Michele, is a Brazilian women's soccer player. She currently plays as a defender for Brazil's Botucatu FC and the Brazilian National Team.

Michele played for Brazil at the 2002 FIFA U-20 Women's World Championship.

References

1984 births
Living people
Michele
Michele
Brazil women's international footballers
Botucatu Futebol Clube players
2007 FIFA Women's World Cup players
2003 FIFA Women's World Cup players